Albright Township, population 2,584, is one of thirteen townships in Chatham County, North Carolina. Albright Township does not contain any municipalities within it.

Geography
The Rocky River, a tributary of the Deep River flows through the township and drains the western and southern areas.  Tributaries to it include Mud Lick Creek, Greenbriar Creek, West Prong of the Rocky River, and Lacy Creek.  South Fork Cane Creek drains the northeastern part of the township.

References

Townships in Chatham County, North Carolina
Townships in North Carolina